Reginald is a masculine given name. It may also refer to:

Reginald, a 1904 collection of short stories by Saki
Andy Dinh, professional gamer known by his gamer tag "Reginald"

See also
Reg (disambiguation)